SE, Se, or Sé may refer to:

Arts and entertainment
 Sé (album), by Lúnasa, 2006
 Se (instrument), a traditional Chinese musical instrument

Businesses and organizations
 Sea Ltd (NYSE: SE), tech conglomerate headquartered in Singapore
 Slovenské elektrárne, electric utility company in Slovakia
 Societas Europaea, a European Union public company
 XL Airways France, IATA airline designator SE
 Southeastern (train operating company), or SE Trains Limited, in England

Places 
 Sè, Atlantique, Benin
 Sè, Mono, Benin
Subprefecture of Sé, São Paulo, Brazil
Sé (district of São Paulo)
Sé (São Paulo Metro), a station
Sé, Hungary
Sé, Macau
Sé (Angra do Heroísmo), Terceira, Azores, Portugal
Sé (Braga), Portugal
Sé (Bragança), Faro, Portugal
Sé (Funchal), Madeira, Portugal
Sé, Lamego, Portugal
Sé (Lisbon), Portugal
Sé, Portalegre, Portugal
Sé (Porto), Portugal
 SE postcode area, London, England
 Sergipe (SE), a state of Brazil
 Sweden, ISO country code SE

Language
 Se (kana) (せ and セ), a Japanese kana
 Northern Sami language, ISO 639-1 code se
 Standard English, in linguistics
 Se (letter) (Ս,ս) an Armenian letter

Science and technology
 Se (unit of measurement), a Japanese unit of area
 .se, Internet country code top-level domain for Sweden
 Selenium, symbol Se, a chemical element
 Standard error, of a statistic
 Status epilepticus, a medical state of persistent seizure
 Synthetic environment, a computer simulation 
 iPhone SE (disambiguation), several uses
 Macintosh SE, an Apple personal computer

Other uses
 Southeast (direction)
 S. E. (name), initials used used by several people
 Lisbon Cathedral, or simply the Sé, Portugal
 Sé da Guarda, Portugal
 Split end, a type of wide receiver in American football
 Somatic experiencing, a method of alternative therapy

See also
 Single-ended (disambiguation)
 Java Platform, Standard Edition (Java SE) 
 Windows 11 SE, a computer operating system